An Independent contractor is a type of worker.

Independent contractor may also refer to:

 Independent contracting in the United States
 Independent Contractors Australia
 Misclassification of employees as independent contractors